Tour de Lille (previously known as Tour du Crédit-Lyonnais between 1995–2006) is an office skyscraper in Euralille, the business district of the Lille metropolitan area.

Designed by Christian de Portzamparc, this emblematic tower of the city of Lille is also called "the ski boot", "the flipper" or even "the L".

116 m high, with an area of 18,135 m2, it is the fifth tallest tower outside of Île-de-France behind the Tour Incity in Lyon, the Tour Part-Dieu in Lyon, the Tour CMA-CGM in Marseille and the Tour Bretagne in Nantes.

The Tour de Lille overlooks the Lille-Europe station.

See also 
 List of tallest buildings in France

References

External links 
 Tour de Lille

Lille
Lille
Office buildings completed in 1995